Osarenoma Igbinovia (born 5 June 1996) is a Nigerian footballer who plays for Bayelsa Queens in the Nigeria Women Premier League, and Nigeria women's national football team at national level.

Career 
At youth level, she represented Nigeria at the 2012 and 2014 FIFA U-20 Women's World Cup.

During the buildup to the 2016 Federation Cup semi final game against Delta Queens, Igbinovia described the training of her team as professional and tactical, explaining that a place in the final will be their quest in the game.

In April 2016, Igbinovia scored a decisive goal for Nigeria against Senegal that sealed her qualification to the 2016 Africa Women Cup of Nations. In the final group game at the tournament against Mali, Igbinovia played in the game, defeating the Malians, four goals to nil.

In May 2016, Igbinovia was nominated alongside Bayelsa Queens teammate, Rofiat Sule for the May edition of the Nigeria Women Premier League player of the month.

Honours 
 2014 FIFA U-20 Women's World Cup - runners up.

References 

1996 births
Bayelsa Queens F.C. players
Living people
Nigerian women's footballers
Women's association football midfielders